Medicine Hat Mall is a shopping centre located adjacent to the TransCanada Highway in Medicine Hat, Alberta, Canada. Anchored by Hudson's Bay, Safeway, Galaxy Cinemas and Shoppers Drug Mart, Medicine Hat Mall has over 50 retail shops and services.

Anchors
Galaxy Cinemas (29,762 sq ft.)
Hudson's Bay (93,217 sq ft.)
Safeway (69,264 sq ft.)
Shoppers Drug Mart (91,281 sq ft.)

The mall also has a vacant Sears store that closed on January 14, 2018 as part of the liquidation of Sears Canadian operations. The mall also hosted a Zellers location until 2012, after which it was converted into a Target Canada outlet during the brief time that chain was in operation.

References

External links
Medicine Hat Mall web page
Primaris Management Inc.

Shopping malls in Alberta
Medicine Hat